Events in the year 2021 in Uruguay.

Incumbents
 President: Luis Lacalle Pou 
 Vice President: Beatriz Argimón

Events
Ongoing — COVID-19 pandemic in Uruguay
February 26 – 192,000 doses of CoronaVac arrive from China. Innuculations of teachers, police officers, firefighters, active duty military personnel, and employees of the Instituto del Niño y Adolescente del Uruguay (INAU) will begin on March 1.
March 25 – An Air Force helicopter carrying Pfizer–BioNTech COVID-19 vaccine en route to Rocha Department catches fire upon landing. The crew are taken to hospital and the cargo, destined for senior citizens (80+) is a total loss.

Scheduled events

March 8-April 26 — 460,000 doses of Pfizer–BioNTech COVID-19 vaccine are scheduled for distribution among health workers.
March 15 — 1,558,000 of CoronaVac are expected to arrive.

Deaths
 
6 January – , singer, songwriter and guitarist (born 1940).
11 January – Walter Taibo, footballer (born 1931).
6 February – Santiago García, 30, footballer (Nacional, River Plate-UY, Godoy Cruz); suicide by gunshot. (body discovered on this date)
23 February – Juan Carlos Masnik, 77, football player (Club Nacional de Football, Uruguay national football team) and manager (Atlético Marte).
6 March – Franco Acosta, 25, footballer (Fénix, Villarreal B, Plaza Colonia); drowned.
12 March
Andrés Abt, 47, politician, deputy (2020); COVID-19.
Uruguay Graffigna, 73, Uruguayan-Chilean footballer (San Luis de Quillota, Los Angeles Aztecs, PEC Zwolle); complications from COVID-19 and Alzheimer's disease.
25 March – Alberto Sonsol, 63, sports journalist and TV presenter; COVID-19.
9 April – Eduardo Malaquina, 84, politician, intendant of Salto (1985–1990, 1995–2005) and senator (2011–2015).
28 August - Pablo Dabezies, 81, priest and theologian.

References

 
2020s in Uruguay
Years of the 21st century in Uruguay
Uruguay
Uruguay